Klondike is a three-part miniseries about the Klondike Gold Rush that was broadcast by the Discovery Channel on January 20–22, 2014. Based on Charlotte Gray's novel Gold Diggers: Striking It Rich in the Klondike, it is the Discovery Channel's first scripted miniseries. Klondike was directed by Simon Cellan Jones and stars Richard Madden as Bill Haskell, a real-life adventurer who traveled to Yukon, Canada, in the late 1890s during the gold rush.

Premise
Traveling west from New York City, friends Bill Haskell and Byron Epstein head to Yukon, Canada, when they learn of the Klondike Gold Rush. The two men must not only contend with harsh conditions and unpredictable weather as they look to profit from a mining claim near Dawson City, but also find themselves threatened by desperate and dangerous individuals who share their pursuit of riches.

Cast

Main
 Richard Madden as Bill Haskell, a recent college graduate who travels west with Byron to partake in the gold rush.
 Abbie Cornish as Belinda Mulrooney, a powerful entrepreneur who later allies herself with Bill.
 Sam Shepard as Father Judge, a humanitarian priest seeking to establish the first church in Dawson City.
 Tim Roth as The Count, an immoral, self-proclaimed aristocrat and Belinda's chief business rival.
 Tim Blake Nelson as Joe Meeker, a bartender employed by Belinda who becomes Bill's partner.
 Marton Csokas as The Superintendent, the head of Dawson City's North-West Mounted Police detachment.
 Conor Leslie as Sabine, a courtesan and later assistant to Father Judge.
 Augustus Prew as Byron Epstein, Bill's ambitious friend and traveling companion.
 Ian Hart as Soapy Smith, a conman looking to profit from Dawson City's visitors.
 Johnny Simmons as Jack London, a young adventurer and aspiring writer.
 Greg Lawson as Goodman, a former military sharpshooter participating in the gold rush.

Guest
 Michael Greyeyes as Cheyeho, the chief of a Tlingit leader tribe.
 Brian Markinson as Cavendesh, a government official.
 Colin Cunningham as "Swiftwater" Bill Gates, a prospector.
 Ron Selmour as Sundown, the leader of the Count's henchmen.
 Adrian Hough as Dan Condon, Belinda's loyal right hand.

Production
Klondike was green-lit by the Discovery Channel in December 2012. The network believed the miniseries would complement their other offerings, such as the reality series Gold Rush and Jungle Gold. Executive producer Dolores Gavin stated, "Our audience loves the idea of the frontier spirit. That whole thing about man versus nature, man versus man, man versus self—those are themes we talk about everyday on Discovery. There was really no difference when we started talking about this project because there were those similarities." It is the network's first-ever scripted miniseries, and contains six parts.

Set in the late 1890s, it is based upon Charlotte Grays book Gold Diggers: Striking It Rich in the Klondike and follows a variety of individuals as they flood into the Klondike in search of gold. Ridley Scott is serving as executive producer, and said "Klondike was the last great gold rush; one which triggered a flood of prospectors ill-equipped, emotionally or otherwise, for the extreme and grueling conditions of the remote Yukon wilderness. The personal adventures are as epic as the landscape, where ambition, greed, sex and murder, as well as their extraordinary efforts to literally strike it rich, are all chronicled by a young Jack London himself." Paul Scheuring, Josh Goldin and Rachel Abramowitz are penning the script.

Production began in March 2013 in Alberta, with Simon Cellan Jones directing. It was expected to take 54 days to shoot six hours of footage. Some of filming took place in April on Fortress Mountain in Kananaskis Country, where the cast contended with "frigid" conditions. A set was created on the CL Ranch (west of Calgary) to represent Dawson City. There, the crew experienced warm weather, which created problems as the actors were forced to wear many layers of clothing and pretend they were cold.

Richard Madden was cast as adventurer Bill Haskell. He agreed to join the miniseries because he was impressed by its script; he also enjoyed Discovery's reality series Gold Rush. The actor explained to Entertainment Weekly in August 2013, "It’s epic, and 'epic' is a word I use rarely to describe something. It’s a story that’s not really been told. [The character's] situations are so extreme physically and emotionally. I’ve done lots of different [projects] and I’ve never been so excited." For the role, Madden had to learn mountaineering in Alberta and at one point was required to jump into river rapids with a grade of 4. He made sure to research his real-life counterpart in books and biographies. He had to contend with high altitudes and wind machines, and noted that the adverse conditions helped him get into character.

Episodes

Reception
The miniseries received positive reviews from critics and holds an 80% approval rating on Rotten Tomatoes, based on 15 reviews. The site consensus reads, "Discovery Channel's first scripted drama, Klondike not only contains an admirable adventure plot, but a masterful exploration of landscapes and cinematography." On Metacritic, the miniseries holds a score of 74 out of 100 based on 19 critics, indicating "generally favorable reviews".

Ratings

References

External links
 

2010s American drama television miniseries
Dawson City
Discovery Channel original programming
Klondike Gold Rush in fiction
Television shows set in Alaska
Television shows set in Yukon
Television series by Scott Free Productions
Television shows filmed in Alberta